Gilles Jean-Yves Thibaudeau (born March 4, 1963) is a Canadian former professional ice hockey player who played 119 games in the National Hockey League (NHL) with the Montreal Canadiens, the Toronto Maple Leafs, and the New York Islanders between 1987 and 1990. The rest of his career, which lasted from 1984 to 2001, was mainly spent in the minor leagues and then in the Swiss Nationalliga A and Natioanlliga B.

Career statistics

Regular season and playoffs

External links
 

1963 births
Living people
Canadian expatriate ice hockey players in Switzerland
Canadian ice hockey centres
Flint Generals players
French Quebecers
HC Davos players
HC Lugano players
HC Sierre players
Ice hockey people from Montreal
Ligue Nord-Américaine de Hockey players
Montreal Canadiens players
New York Islanders players
Newmarket Saints players
SC Rapperswil-Jona Lakers players
Sherbrooke Canadiens players
Springfield Indians players
Toronto Maple Leafs players
Undrafted National Hockey League players